The stalk of a sheaf is a mathematical construction capturing the behaviour of a sheaf around a given point.

Motivation and definition
Sheaves are defined on open sets, but the underlying topological space  consists of points. Conceptually speaking, we do this by looking at small neighborhoods of the point. Of course, no single neighborhood will be small enough, so we will have to take a limit of some sort.

Alternative definition
There is another approach to defining a stalk that is useful in some contexts. Then the stalk  is the same as the inverse image sheaf . Over , however, we get:

Remarks
For some categories C the direct limit used to define the stalk may not exist.  However, it exists for most categories which occur in practice, such as the category of sets or most categories of algebraic objects such as abelian groups or rings, which are namely cocomplete.

Examples

Constant sheaves
The constant sheaf  associated to some set (or group, ring, etc).  has the same set or group as stalks at every point: for any point , pick an open connected neighborhood. Therefore, the direct limit collapses to yield  as the stalk.

Sheaves of analytic functions
For example, in the sheaf of analytic functions on an analytic manifold, a germ of a function at a point determines the function in a small neighborhood of a point.  This is because the germ records the function's power series expansion, and all analytic functions are by definition locally equal to their power series.  Using analytic continuation, we find that the germ at a point determines the function on any connected open set where the function can be everywhere defined.  (This does not imply that all the restriction maps of this sheaf are injective!)

Sheaves of smooth functions
In contrast, for the sheaf of smooth functions on a smooth manifold, germs contain some local information, but are not enough to reconstruct the function on any open neighborhood. For example, let  be a bump function which is identically one in a neighborhood of the origin and identically zero far away from the origin. On any sufficiently small neighborhood containing the origin,  is identically one, so at the origin it has the same germ as the constant function with value 1. Suppose that we want to reconstruct  from its germ. Even if we know in advance that  is a bump function, the germ does not tell us how large its bump is. From what the germ tells us, the bump could be infinitely wide, that is,  could equal the constant function with value 1.

On the other hand, germs of smooth functions can distinguish between the constant function with value one and the function , because the latter function is not identically one on any neighborhood of the origin. (This extra information is related to the fact that the stalk of the sheaf of smooth functions at the origin is a non-Noetherian ring. The Krull intersection theorem says that this cannot happen for a Noetherian ring.)

Quasi-coherent sheaves
On an affine scheme , the stalk of a quasi-coherent sheaf  corresponding to an -module  in a point  corresponding to a prime ideal  is just the localization .

Skyscraper sheaf
The same property holds for any point  if the topological space in question is a T1 space, since every point of a T1 space is closed. This feature is the basis of the construction of Godement resolutions, used for example in algebraic geometry to get functorial injective resolutions of sheaves.

Properties of the stalk
As outlined in the introduction, stalks capture the local behaviour of a sheaf. As a sheaf is supposed to be determined by its local restrictions (see gluing axiom), it can be expected that the stalks capture a fair amount of the information that the sheaf is encoding. This is indeed true:
A morphism of sheaves is an isomorphism, epimorphism, or monomorphism, respectively, if and only if the induced morphisms on all stalks have the same property. (However it is not true that two sheaves, all of whose stalks are isomorphic, are isomorphic, too, because there may be no map between the sheaves in question.)
In particular:
A sheaf is zero (if we are dealing with sheafs of groups), if and only if all stalks of the sheaf vanish. Therefore, the exactness of a given functor can be tested on the stalks, which is often easier as one can pass to smaller and smaller neighbourhoods.

Both statements are false for presheaves. However, stalks of sheaves and presheaves are tightly linked:
This follows from the fact that the sheaf  is the image of  through the left adjoint  (because the sheafification functor is left adjoint to the inclusion functor ) and the fact that left adjoints preserve colimits.

External links 
 stalk in nLab

Sheaf theory

de:Garbe (Mathematik)#Halme und Keime